Richard A. Young (August 25, 1930 – March 31, 2012) was an American football fullback and halfback who played college football for Chattanooga and professional football in the National Football League (NFL) for the Baltimore Colts (1955–1956) and Pittsburgh Steelers (1957). He appeared in 34 NFL games, three of them as a starter. He also played for the Hamilton Tiger-Cats of the Canadian Football League (CFL) in 1960.

Early years
Young was born in 1930 in Trumbull, Connecticut, and attended Trumbull High School. He then played college football at Chattanooga.

Professional football
He was drafted by the Chicago Cardinals in the 18th round (206th overall pick) in the 1954 NFL Draft. He did not appear in any regular season games with the Cardinals. He spent the 1955 and 1956 seasons with the Baltimore Colts, appearing in 23 games, none as a starter.  In 1957, he played for the Pittsburgh Steelers, appearing in 11 games and rushing for 153 yards on 56 carries. He concluded his playing career in the Canadian Football League (CFL) with the Hamilton Tiger-Cats in 1960. He appeared in three games for Hamilton.

Later years
Dick died in 2012 at age 81 in Milford, Connecticut.

References

1930 births
2012 deaths
American football fullbacks
American football halfbacks
Baltimore Colts players
Pittsburgh Steelers players
Chattanooga Mocs football players
Players of American football from Connecticut